The Ministry of Housing and Urbanism of Chile (MINVU) is an institution in charge of the planning, development and urbanization of inhabited or habitable spaces in Chile.

Its current minister is Carlos Montes.

List of representatives

References

External Link
 

Government ministries of Chile